Redman is an unincorporated community in Macon County, in the U.S. state of Missouri.

History
An old variant name was "Ettle". A post office called Ettle was established in 1882, the name was changed to Redman in 1890, and the post office closed in 1914. The present name most likely honors George Redman, an early settler.

References

Unincorporated communities in Macon County, Missouri
Unincorporated communities in Missouri